The 2017 Audi Cup of China was the 3rd event of six in the 2017–18 ISU Grand Prix of Figure Skating, a senior-level international invitational competition series. It was held at the Capital Gymnasium in Beijing on 3–5 November. Medals were awarded in the disciplines of men's singles, ladies' singles, pair skating, and ice dance. Skaters earned points toward qualifying for the 2017–18 Grand Prix Final.

Records 

The following new ISU best scores were set during this competition:

Entries 
The ISU published the preliminary assignments on 26 May 2017.

Changes to preliminary assignments

Results

Men

Ladies

Pairs

Ice dance

References

Citations

External links 
 2017 Cup of China at the International Skating Union

2017
2017 in figure skating
2017 in Chinese sport
Sports competitions in Beijing
2010s in Beijing
November 2017 sports events in China